The Sun Post was a weekly newspaper in California, owned and published by Carlon Perry and Cecelia Drake. The newspaper was published on Friday and delivered through the mail free of charge to 29,000 households of Manteca and Lathrop, California. The newspaper was launched in November 2005 and was tabloid-sized.

The Sun Post was awarded in 2005 by the California Newspaper Publishers Association second place for General Excellence in news coverage, editorial, and graphics among all large non-daily newspapers in the State of California.

While the newspaper had its own staff and was independently owned, the Tracy Press was a publishing partner, which allowed shared advertising with other Tracy Press publications. The Sun Post ceased publication in September 2009.

References

Weekly newspapers published in California
Publications established in 2005